Arktis (stylized as Arktis., the Norwegian for "Arctic") is the sixth studio album by Norwegian progressive metal artist Ihsahn. The album was released on 8 April 2016 through Candlelight Records.

Track listing

References 

2016 albums
Ihsahn albums